John William Jackson Jr. (born 1917), nicknamed "Big Train", is an American former Negro league pitcher who played between 1938 and 1940.

A native of Louisiana, Jackson made his Negro leagues debut in 1938 with the Kansas City Monarchs, and played with the Monarchs again the following season. He finished his career in 1940 with the Memphis Red Sox.

References

External links
 and Seamheads

1917 births
Date of birth missing
Place of birth missing
Kansas City Monarchs players
Memphis Red Sox players
Possibly living people